Acromargarita oliverai is a species of sea snail, a marine gastropod mollusk in the family Mitridae, the miters or miter snails.

Description

Distribution

References

 Poppe G.T. (2008) New Fissurellidae, Epitoniidae, Aclididae, Mitridae and Costellariidae from the Philippines. Visaya 2(3): 37-63. 
 Huang, S.-I. (2021). A new genus Acromargarita n. gen. and four new Mitridae from the Indo-Pacific Ocean (Mollusca: Gastropoda). Visaya. 5(5): 79-94.

Mitridae
Gastropods described in 2008